Landshark, land shark or land-shark may refer to:

 German Shepherd Dog, a dog breed
 Pit bull, a dog breed
 Speculator, in real estate

Media and entertainment
 Land Shark (Saturday Night Live), a recurring SNL character
 Land Shark, a Masters of the Universe vehicle
 Landshark (Transformers), a Transformers character
 Landshark, a 1982 album by Fang
 Bulette (Dungeons & Dragons) or landshark, a classic Dungeons & Dragons monster

Products
 Land Shark Lager, a pale Anheuser-Busch brands lager
 Mosler Land Shark, a supercar made by Mosler Automotive
 Porsche 928, an automobile

Other uses
 Hard Rock Stadium, Miami Gardens, Florida, US (known as Land Shark Stadium in 2009)
 The mascot of Landmark College in Putney, Vermont
 Tony the Landshark, mascot of the University of Mississippi (Ole Miss)

See also
 Sand shark
 Street Shark or Hurricane Shark, a shark found in a flooded urban area